Phebalium lowanense, commonly known as the Lowan phebalium, is a species of slender shrub that is endemic to southern continental Australia. It is more or less covered with silvery and rust-coloured scales and has leaves appearing to be cylindrical, and yellow mauve flowers in umbels on the ends of branches.

Description
The upper surface of the leaves is glabrous and slightly scaly, and the lower surface is covered with silvery scales. Flowering occurs August to September.

Taxonomy and naming
Phebalium lowanense was first formally described in 1957 by James Hamlyn Willis in The Victorian Naturalist from specimens he collected near the border between South Australia and Victoria in 1948.

Distribution and habitat
Lowan phebalium grows in open heathy mallee woodland in a restricted area in the Murray Darling Depression biogeographic region near the South Australia-Victoria border.

Conservation status
This phebalium is classified as "vulnerable" under the Australian Government Environment Protection and Biodiversity Conservation Act 1999. The main threats to the species are changed fire regimes, weed invasion, and clearing of roadsides and tracks.

References

lowanense
Flora of South Australia
Flora of Victoria (Australia)
Plants described in 1957
Taxa named by James Hamlyn Willis